The 1946 Far Western Conference football season was the season of college football played by the three member schools of the Far Western Conference (FWC) as part of the 1946 college football season.

The Humboldt State Lumberjacks won the FWC championship with a 5–3–1 record (1–0–1 against conference opponents) and outscored opponents by a total of 84 to 70.

Conference overview

Teams

Humboldt State

Chico State

The 1946 Chico State Wildcats football team represented Chico State College (now known as California State University, Chico) of Chico, California. Led by fifth-year head coach Roy Bohler, Chico State compiled an overall record of 2–7 with a mark of 1–1 in conference play, placing second in the FWC. The team was outscored by its opponents 109 to 61 for the season. The Wildcats played home games at Chico High School Stadium in Chico.

This was the first team Chico State fielded in four years. They had no team during the war years of 1943 to 1945.

Cal Aggies

The 1946 Cal Aggies football team represented the University of California College of Agriculture at Davis, California (now known as the University of California, Davis). Led by seventh-year head coach Vern Hickey, the Aggies compiled an overall record of 0–5–2 with a mark of 0–1–1 in conference play, placing third in the FWC. The team was outscored by its opponents 113 to 54 for the season. The Cal Aggies played home games at A Street field on campus in Davis, California. 

The Aggies did not play in the 1943 to 1945 seasons due to World War II.

Schedule

Notes

References